Christine Madeleine Odette Lagarde (née Lallouette, ; born 1 January 1956) is a French politician and lawyer who has served as President of the European Central Bank since 2019. She previously served as the 11th Managing Director of the International Monetary Fund (IMF) from 2011 to 2019. Lagarde had also served in the Government of France, most prominently as Minister of the Economy, Finance and Industry from 2007 until 2011. She was the first woman to hold each of those posts. 

Born and raised in Paris, Lagarde graduated from law school at Paris Nanterre University and obtained a Master's degree from Sciences Po Aix. After being admitted to the Paris Bar, she joined the multinational law firm Baker & McKenzie as an associate in 1981, specializing in labor, anti-trust, as well as mergers and acquisitions. Rising through the ranks, she was a member of the executive committee of the firm from 1995 until 1999, before being elevated to its Chair between 1999 and 2004; she was the first woman in both positions. She held the top post until she decided to go into public service.

Lagarde returned to France when appointed Minister of Foreign Trade from 2005 to 2007, then briefly served as Minister of Agriculture and Fisheries from May to June 2007, and finally, as Minister of Finance from 2007 to 2011, making her the first female to hold the finance portfolio of any Group of Eight economy. During her tenure, Lagarde oversaw the government response to the late 2000s financial crisis, for which the Financial Times ranked her the best finance minister in the Eurozone.

On 5 July 2011, she was elected to replace Dominique Strauss-Kahn as managing director of the IMF for a five-year term. Her appointment was the 11th consecutive appointment of a European to head the IMF. She was selected by consensus for a second five-year term, starting 5 July 2016, being the only candidate nominated for the post. In December 2016, a French court convicted her of negligence relating to her role in the Bernard Tapie arbitration, but did not impose a penalty. Lagarde resigned from the IMF following her nomination as president of the ECB.

In 2019 and again in 2020, Forbes ranked her number two on its World's 100 Most Powerful Women list.

Early life and education 
Lagarde was born in Paris, France, into a family of teachers.  Her Father, Robert Lallouette, "was born to a Jewish mother and a non-religious father.", was an English teacher; her mother, Nicole (Carré), was a Latin, Greek and French literature teacher. Lagarde and her three younger brothers spent their childhood in Le Havre. There she attended the Lycée François 1er (where her father taught) and Lycée Claude Monet. 

As a teenager, Lagarde was a member of the French national synchronised swimming team. After her baccalauréat in 1973, she went on an American Field Service scholarship to the Holton-Arms School in Bethesda, Maryland. During her year in the United States, Lagarde worked as an intern at the U.S. Capitol as Representative William Cohen's congressional assistant, helping him correspond with French-speaking constituents from his northern Maine district during the Watergate hearings. She graduated from Paris West University Nanterre La Défense, where she obtained master's degrees in English, labour law, and social law. She also holds a master's degree from the Institut d'études politiques in Aix-en-Provence. Since 2010, she has presided over the Aix school's board of directors.

Professional career 
Lagarde joined Baker & McKenzie, a large Chicago-based international law firm, in 1981. She handled major antitrust and labour cases, was made partner after six years and was named head of the firm in Western Europe. She joined the executive committee in 1995 and was elected the company's first female chairman in October 1999.

In 2004, Lagarde became president of the Global Strategic Committee.

Ministerial career 
As France's trade minister between 2005 and May 2007, Lagarde prioritized opening new markets for the country's products, focusing on the technology sector. On 18 May 2007, she was moved to the Ministry of Agriculture as part of the government of François Fillon. The following month she joined Fillon's cabinet in the Ministry of Economic Affairs, Finance and Employment. She was the only member of the French political class to condemn Jean-Paul Guerlain's racist remarks of 2010. In government, she implemented liberal economic reforms, such as liberalizing the labor market, lowering estate taxes, and an austerity plan for public services.

International Monetary Fund

Appointment 

On 25 May 2011, Lagarde announced her candidacy to be head of the IMF to succeed Dominique Strauss-Kahn, upon his resignation. Her candidacy received the support of the British, Indian, United States, Brazilian, Russian, Chinese and German governments. The governor of the Bank of Mexico (and former Secretary of Finance) Agustín Carstens was also nominated for the post. His candidacy was supported by many Latin American governments, as well as Spain, Canada and Australia.

On 28 June 2011, the IMF board elected Lagarde as its next managing director and chairman for a five-year term, starting on 5 July 2011. The IMF's executive board praised both Lagarde and Carstens as well-qualified, but decided on the former by consensus. Lagarde became the first woman to be elected as the head of the IMF. Carstens would have been the first non-European. Her appointment came amid the intensification of the European sovereign debt crisis especially in Greece, with fears looming of loan defaults. The United States in particular supported her speedy appointment in light of the fragility of Europe's economic situation.

U.S. Treasury Secretary Timothy Geithner said that Lagarde's "exceptional talent and broad experience will provide invaluable leadership for this indispensable institution at a critical time for the global economy." President Nicolas Sarkozy referred to Lagarde's appointment as "a victory for France." Oxfam, a charity working in developing nations, called the appointment process "farcical" and argued that what it saw as a lack of transparency hurt the IMF's credibility.

On 17 December 2015, Michel Sapin, French Finance Minister, said that Lagarde could stay on as head of the IMF, despite being charged with criminal negligence. Throughout her time at the IMF, she repeatedly ruled herself out of the races to secure a top job in Europe, including the positions of President of the European Commission and President of the European Central Bank. On 2 July 2019, Lagarde was nominated to serve as the next president of the ECB, to succeed Mario Draghi. She subsequently submitted her resignation as managing director.

Viewpoints 

In July 2010, Lagarde told the PBS NewsHour that the IMF's lending program for distressed European countries was "a very massive plan, totally unexpected, totally counter-treaty, because it wasn't scheduled in the treaty that we should do a bailout program, as we did." She also said, "we had essentially a trillion dollars on the table to confront any market attack that would target any country, whether it's Greece, Spain, Portugal, or anybody within the eurozone." With respect to the French economy, she stated that besides short-term stimulus efforts: "we must, very decisively, cut our deficit and reduce our debt."

In public remarks made right after her appointment, Lagarde stated that both the IMF and EU required Greek austerity measures as a prerequisite for further aid. She said, "If I have one message tonight about Greece, it is to call on the Greek political opposition to support the party that is currently in power in a spirit of national unity." She said of her predecessor that: "The IMF has taken up the challenges of the crisis thanks to the actions of Managing Director Dominique Strauss-Kahn and to his team as well." On 25 December 2011, Lagarde argued that the world economy was at risk and urged Europeans to unify in terms of the debt crisis facing the continent.

In July 2012, as the Greek economy continued to decline, and the country's leaders asked for an easing of the terms of external assistance, Lagarde said she was "not in the negotiation or renegotiation mood at all." A year later, though, with her own organization conceding that its "rescue" package for Greece had fallen short of what was required, Lagarde—having previously said that Greece's debt burden was "sustainable"—decided that Greece would not recover unless its debt was written off in a meaningful way. According to Yanis Varoufakis, the combative former Finance Minister of Greece, Lagarde and others at the top of the IMF were quite sympathetic behind closed doors, while stating that inside the Eurogroup there were "a few kind words and that was it". As the crisis peaked again in summer 2015, Lagarde's organization made headlines by calling for massive debt relief for Greece, a call she reiterated personally. In 2016, the IMF refused to participate with eurozone countries in further emergency financing for Greece, because concrete measures to relieve the country of its debt burden remained absent.

Questioned about her economic philosophy, Lagarde has described herself as "with Adam Smith—that is, liberal."

"Payback" controversy 

In an interview in May 2012, Lagarde was asked about the Greek government-debt crisis. She mentioned Greek tax avoidance, and assented to the interviewer's suggestion that Greeks had "had a nice time" but now "it is payback time." Her comments provoked controversy, with future Greek Prime Minister Alexis Tsipras stating, "We don't need her compassion," and then-Deputy Prime Minister Evangelos Venizelos saying she had "insulted the Greek people." In an effort to quell the negative response, the next day Lagarde made a post to her Facebook page saying: "As I have said many times before, I am very sympathetic to the Greek people and the challenges they are facing." Within 24 hours, over 10,000 comments had been left in response, many of them obscene. 

In response to Lagarde's belief that not enough Greeks paid their taxes, Professor Emeritus John Weeks of the University of London said, "The moral weight of Christine Lagarde's matronising of the Greeks to pay their taxes is not strengthened by the fact that, as director of the IMF, she is in receipt of a tax-free annual salary of $468,000 (£298,000, plus perks)." Robert W. Wood, in a Forbes article, wrote that "No taxes is the norm for most United Nations employees covered by a convention on diplomatic relations signed by most nations."

Comment on King Abdullah 

In January 2015, on the death of King Abdullah of Saudi Arabia, Lagarde said "he was a strong believer in pushing forward women's rights", prompting a number of observers to comment on the life of women generally in Saudi Arabia.

European Central Bank 

On 2 July 2019, Lagarde was nominated by the European Council to succeed Mario Draghi as President of the European Central Bank (ECB) on 1 November 2019. On 17 September 2019, the European Parliament voted via secret ballot to recommend her to the position, with 394 in favor, 206 opposed, and 49 abstentions. 

As president, Lagarde is expected to maintain the accommodative monetary policy of her predecessor, Mario Draghi. When addressing the European Parliament's ECON Committee ahead of her appointment, Lagarde also expressed her willingness to make the ECB play a role in fighting climate change and to carry out a review of the ECB's monetary policy framework. 

She received the insignia of Commander of the National Order of Merit from Emmanuel Macron in February 2022. According to the French press, Nicolas Sarkozy suggested to Emmanuel Macron that she become his Prime Minister in case of re-election in the French presidential election of 2022.

Other activities

European Union institutions
 European Systemic Risk Board (ESRB), ex officio chair of the General Board (since 2019)
 European Investment Bank (EIB), ex officio member of the board of governors (2007–2011)

International organizations
 Bank for International Settlements (BIS), ex officio member of the board of directors (since 2019)
 Asian Development Bank (ADB), ex officio member of the board of governors (2007–2011)
 European Bank for Reconstruction and Development (EBRD), ex officio member of the board of governors (2007–2011)
 International Monetary Fund (IMF), ex officio member of the board of governors (2007–2011)
 World Bank, ex officio member of the board of governors (2007–2011)

Non-profit organizations
 World Economic Forum (WEF), member of the board of trustees (since 2011)

Academic institutions
 Honorary fellow of Robinson College, Cambridge

Controversy

The Lagarde list 

In 2010 Lagarde, then finance minister of France, sent a list of 1,991 names of Greek customers who were potential tax avoiders with bank accounts at HSBC's Geneva branch to the Greek government.

On 28 October 2012, Greek reporter and editor Kostas Vaxevanis claimed to be in possession of the list and published a document with more than 2,000 names in his magazine Hot Doc. He was immediately arrested on charges of breaching privacy laws with a possible sentence of up to two years in prison. After a public outcry, Vaxevanis was found not guilty three days later. Vaxevanis then faced a retrial (the Greek authorities were yet to charge anyone on the list), but was acquitted again. A few days before the Greek general elections of January 2015, when it was clear that left-wing Syriza would come to power, the financial crimes police of the conservative government of Antonis Samaras shredded reams of documents pertaining to corruption cases.

Conviction of negligence in allowing the misuse of public funds 
On 3 August 2011, a French court ordered an investigation into Lagarde's role in a 2007 €403 million arbitration deal in favour of businessman Bernard Tapie when she was finance minister. On 20 March 2013, Lagarde's apartment in Paris was raided by French police as part of the investigation. On 24 May 2013, after two days of questioning at the Court of Justice of the Republic (CJR), Lagarde was assigned the status of "assisted witness", meaning that she herself was not under investigation in the affair. According to a press report from June 2013, Lagarde was described by Stéphane Richard, the CEO of France Telecom (a former aide to Lagarde when she was finance minister), who was himself put under formal investigation in the case, as having been fully briefed before approving the arbitration process which benefited Bernard Tapie.

In 2013, the press revealed an undated hand-written letter seized by investigators during a search of Christine Lagarde's Paris home, in which she appears to express her full allegiance to then-President Nicolas Sarkozy: "Use me for as long as it suits you and suits your action and your casting. (...) If you use me, I need you as a guide and as a support: without a guide, I risk being ineffective, without a support I risk having little credibility. With my immense admiration. Christine L."

Subsequently, in August 2014 the CJR announced that it had formally approved a negligence investigation into Lagarde's role in the arbitration of the Tapie case. On 17 December 2015, the CJR ordered Lagarde to stand trial before it for alleged negligence in handling the Tapie arbitration approval. In December 2016, the court found Lagarde guilty of negligence, but declined to impose a penalty.

Media 
Lagarde was interviewed in the documentary film Inside Job (2010), which later won an Academy Award for Best Documentary Feature.

The American fashion magazine Vogue profiled Lagarde in September 2011.

Lagarde was portrayed by Laila Robins in the HBO television film Too Big to Fail (2011), which was based on the popular non-fiction book of the same name by The New York Times journalist Andrew Ross Sorkin.

Meryl Streep based parts of Miranda Priestly's appearance in the feature film The Devil Wears Prada (2006) on Lagarde, citing her "unassailable elegance and authority".

Lagarde presented the 2014 Richard Dimbleby Lecture, titled "A New Multilateralism for the 21st Century".

Recognition

Awards
 2011 – 9th Most Powerful Woman in the World, named by Forbes magazine
 2012 – 8th Most Powerful Woman in the World, named by Forbes magazine
 2013 – 7th Most Powerful Woman in the World, named by Forbes magazine
 2014 – 5th Most Powerful Woman in the World, named by Forbes magazine
 2015 – 6th Most Powerful Woman in the World, named by Forbes magazine
 2016 – 6th Most Powerful Woman in the World, named by Forbes magazine
 2017 – 8th Most Powerful Woman in the World, named by Forbes magazine
 2017 – #1 in the List of 100 Most Influential People in Multinational Organisations, awarded by UK-based company Richtopia
 2018 – 3rd Most Powerful Woman in the World, named by Forbes magazine
 2019 – CARE Humanitarian Award, awarded by CARE
 2019 –  Distinguished International Leadership Award, awarded by the Atlantic Council
 2019 – 2nd Most Powerful Woman in the World, named by Forbes magazine
2020 – 2nd Most Powerful Woman in the World, named by Forbes magazine
2022 - 2nd Most Powerful Woman in the World, named by Forbes magazine

Honours 
  Officer of the Légion d'honneur (6 April 2012 ; Chevalier in 2000)
  Commander of the National Order of Merit (2021)
  Commander of the Order of Mérite agricole (2008)
  Commander of the Ordre du Mérite Maritime  (2007)
  Grand Officer of the National Order of the Ivory Coast  (2013)
  Medal of the Order of Friendship (2010)

Honorary doctorate 
 Honorary doctorate from KU Leuven (Belgium) – awarded at KU Leuven Kulak
 Honorary doctorate from Université de Montréal.

Personal life
Lagarde is divorced and has two sons, Pierre-Henri Lagarde (born 1986) and Thomas Lagarde (born 1988). Since 2006, her partner has been the entrepreneur Xavier Giocanti from Marseille.

She is a health-conscious vegetarian, and her hobbies include regular trips to the gym, cycling, and swimming.

She speaks French, English and Spanish.

References

External links

Official 
 Biography at the European Central Bank
 Biography at the International Monetary Fund

Other 
 Column archive at Project Syndicate
 
 
 

1956 births
Living people
20th-century French businesspeople
20th-century French lawyers
20th-century French women lawyers
21st-century French businesspeople
21st-century French diplomats
21st-century French lawyers
21st-century French women lawyers
21st-century French women politicians
Antitrust lawyers
Businesspeople from Paris
Commanders of the Order of Agricultural Merit
Female finance ministers
French chairpersons of corporations
French chief executives
French Ministers of Agriculture
French Ministers of Commerce and Industry
French Ministers of Finance
French officials of the European Union
French officials of the United Nations
French politicians convicted of crimes
French synchronized swimmers
French women chief executives
French women diplomats
French women lawyers
Labour lawyers
Managing directors of the International Monetary Fund
People associated with Baker McKenzie
Politicians from Paris
Politicians of the French Fifth Republic
Presidents of the European Central Bank
The Republicans (France) politicians
Sciences Po Aix alumni
Union for a Popular Movement politicians
University of Paris alumni
Women government ministers of France